The 2016 Metro Atlantic Athletic Conference men's basketball tournament was the postseason men's basketball tournament for the Metro Atlantic Athletic Conference for the 2015–16 NCAA Division I men's basketball season. It was held from March 3–7, 2016 at the Times Union Center in Albany, New York. No. 2 seed Iona upset No. 1 seed Monmouth 79–76 in the championship game and received the conference's automatic bid to the 2016 NCAA tournament. It was the fourth consecutive championship game for Iona, and their conference leading ninth MAAC tournament championship.

Seeds
All 11 teams in the conference participated in the Tournament. The top five teams received byes to the Quarterfinals.

Teams were seeded by record within the conference, with a tiebreaker system to seed teams with identical conference records.

Schedule

Bracket

All-Championship Team

References

MAAC men's basketball tournament
2015–16 Metro Atlantic Athletic Conference men's basketball season
MAAC men's basketball tournament
MAAC men's basketball tournament
College basketball tournaments in New York (state)
Basketball competitions in Albany, New York